Private Enterprise Numbers (PENs) are created and maintained by the Internet Assigned Numbers Authority (IANA) in a public registry, including a publicly revealed email address and "contact name".  Any private enterprise (organization) may request, at no cost, a Private Enterprise Number (PEN) to be assigned. All applications are reviewed manually, and the requirements are not explicitly documented. Although the list of PENs includes contact names like "Engineering MIB Administrator", IANA may reject applications if the contact name doesn't 'look like' it corresponds to a real person.

Enterprise numbers are commonly used in the Management Information Base (MIB) associated with the Simple Network Management Protocol (SNMP), in vendor suboptions of the Dynamic Host Configuration Protocol (DHCP), in Lightweight Directory Access Protocol (LDAP), RADIUS Vendor-specific attributes, PFCP Vendor Specific IEs and in syslog structured data (RFC 5424).

See also 
 Object identifier

External links 
 IANA Private Enterprise Numbers

Identifiers
Network management